Jerrard is a surname. Notable people with the surname include:

 Alan Jerrard (1897–1968), English recipient of the Victoria Cross
 George Jerrard (1804–1863), British mathematician
 Harold George Jerrard (1921–2013), Physicist and Mayor of Fareham
 Jack Jerrard, Named the Torpoint buses
 John Alexander Jerrard, judge of the Supreme Court of Queensland
 Paul Jerrard, hockey player for the Minnesota North Stars